Blue Mound is a city in Linn County, Kansas, United States.  As of the 2020 census, the population of the city was 219.

History
Blue Mound was laid out in 1882. It was named by its first postmaster, John Quincy Adams, because its elevation is said to look blue from a distance.

Geography
Blue Mound is located at  (38.090283, -95.008409).

Demographics

2010 census
As of the census of 2010, there were 275 people, 111 households, and 75 families residing in the city. The racial makeup of the city was 97.5% White, 0.4% African American, 0.4% Native American, and 1.8% from two or more races.

There were 111 households, of which 33.3% had children under the age of 18 living with them, 55.9% were married couples living together, 5.4% had a female householder with no husband present, 6.3% had a male householder with no wife present, and 32.4% were non-families. 27.9% of all households were made up of individuals, and 10.8% had someone living alone who was 65 years of age or older. The average household size was 2.48 and the average family size was 3.00.

The median age in the city was 38.1 years. 25.1% of residents were under the age of 18; 7.7% were between the ages of 18 and 24; 25.4% were from 25 to 44; 28.3% were from 45 to 64; and 13.5% were 65 years of age or older. The gender makeup of the city was 50.5% male and 49.5% female.

2000 census
As of the census of 2000, there were 277 people, 116 households, and 69 families residing in the city. The racial makeup of the city was 98.56% White, 0.72% Native American, and 0.72% from two or more races.

There were 116 households, out of which 32.8% had children under the age of 18 living with them, 46.6% were married couples living together, 6.0% had a female householder with no husband present, and 39.7% were non-families. 37.1% of all households were made up of individuals, and 24.1% had someone living alone who was 65 years of age or older. The average household size was 2.39, and the average family size was 3.16.

In the city, the population was spread out, with 30.3% under the age of 18, 6.5% from 18 to 24, 24.5% from 25 to 44, 20.2% from 45 to 64, and 18.4% who were 65 years of age or older. The median age was 36 years. For every 100 females, there were 103.7 males. For every 100 females age 18 and over, there were 91.1 males.

The median income for a household in the city was $21,364, and the median income for a family was $41,500. Males had a median income of $32,083 versus $15,313 for females. The per capita income for the city was $10,650. About 12.5% of families and 18.8% of the population were below the poverty line, including 12.0% of those under the age of eighteen and 17.8% of those 65 or over.

References

Further reading

External links
 Blue Mound – Directory of Public Officials
 USD 346, local school district
 Blue Mound city map, KDOT

Cities in Kansas
Cities in Linn County, Kansas
1882 establishments in Kansas